Hydropeplus is a genus of beetles in the family Dytiscidae, containing the following species:

 Hydropeplus montanus Omer-Cooper, 1965
 Hydropeplus trimaculatus (Laporte, 1835)

References

Dytiscidae